Phoberomys is an extinct genus of rodents. Fossil specimens from the Late Miocene period have been discovered in the Ituzaingó Formation of Argentina, the Solimões Formation of Brazil, the Urumaco Formation at Urumaco in Venezuela, and the Pliocene of Peru.

Species 
Species in the genus described are:

 Phoberomys burmeisteri (=P. insolita, P. lozanoi, P. minima, P. praecursor)
 Phoberomys pattersoni

Another species, P. bordasii, has been considered as possibly belonging to Neoepiblema.

References 

Prehistoric pacaranas
Miocene rodents
Miocene mammals of South America
Huayquerian
Neogene Argentina
Neogene Brazil
Paraná Basin
Neogene Venezuela
Fossils of Argentina
Fossils of Brazil
Fossils of Venezuela
Fossil taxa described in 1926
Prehistoric rodent genera
Ituzaingó Formation